Mamun Khan (born 20 December 1985) is a retired Bangladeshi professional footballer who played as a goalkeeper. He last played club football for Muktijoddha Sangsad KC in the Bangladesh Premier League. He also played for the Bangladesh national football team from 2011 to 2013. He started his professional career in 2007 with Chittagong Mohammedan SC.

Club career
Having started his career with Chittagong Mohammedan SC in the early years of the B.League, Mamun's most memorable moment in club football was winning the  2013 Super Cup with Mohammedan SC. He helped Mohammedan win trophy by producing two saves during the penalty shootout in the finals against his former club Sheikh Russel KC. The Super Cup was his first professional silverware. His penalty saving ability was again put into display, when he helped Mohammedan defeat Feni SC on penalties, in the 2014 Modhumoti Bank Independence Cup final.

International career
On 21 March 2011, Mamun made his debut for Bangladesh in international football by participating in the group stage match of the  2012 AFC Challenge Cup qualifiers against Palestine. He was included in the starting XI of that match; Bangladesh lost the match 2–0. In his inaugural year for Bangladesh, Mamun played a total of 5 matches.

References 

1985 births
Living people
Bangladeshi footballers
Bangladesh international footballers
Association football goalkeepers
Bangladesh Football Premier League players
Muktijoddha Sangsad KC players
Sheikh Jamal Dhanmondi Club players
Mohammedan SC (Dhaka) players
Sheikh Russel KC players
People from Brahmanbaria district